The Lot, originally the Olt, is a river in France. It is a right-bank tributary of the Garonne. It gives its name to the départements of Lot and Lot-et-Garonne.

The Lot is prone to flooding in the winter and spring, and has many dams in its upper catchment area, mainly on the Truyère, which produce hydroelectric power of strategic importance for the French national grid. Turbining can cause additional variations in flow throughout the 275 km of the river that has been extensively developed as an asset for tourism in the region. The major project to restore navigability of the river Lot was conceived by local stakeholders in Decazeville and Cahors in the 1970s. It meant restoring the many locks, and bypassing the medium-head dams built at five locations along the former waterway.

Main tributaries
 Lède (near Villeneuve-sur-Lot)
 Célé (near Cabrerets)
 Dourdou de Conques (in Grand-Vabre)
 Truyère (in Entraygues-sur-Truyère)
 Colagne (in Le Monastier-Pin-Moriès)

Departments and towns
The Lot flows through the following départements and towns: Lozère (Mende), Cantal, Aveyron (Entraygues-sur-Truyère, Flagnac, Capdenac-Gare), Lot (Cahors) and Lot-et-Garonne (Villeneuve-sur-Lot, Aiguillon).

Navigation
From the Middle Ages flat-bottomed gabarres traded between Entraygues and the Garonne, a distance of 297 km. In the late 17th century Jean-Baptiste Colbert ordered improvements to navigation. A second phase of canalisation became necessary when the open-cast coal mines in Decazeville started supplying coal to fuel the industrial revolution, from 1840. About 75 weirs (chaussées) and locks were built over the 270 km up to Bouquiès near Decazeville. Barges continued to ply the river after the first railway was opened from Montauban to Capdenac in 1858. Canals were then built to bypass the river’s meanders at Luzech, Cajarc, Montbrun and Capdenac. The short reprieve for river navigation came to end when the railway was opened along the valley in sections from 1869. The navigation was abandoned in 1926. An association was founded by Christian Bernad in 1971 to promote restoration for tourism. A study to assess the feasibility of developing waterway tourism on the river was undertaken in 1985-86, and led to the first 64 km length being restored and opened in 1990. The Lot is now open to recreational navigation and passenger boats in three sections, with long-term plans to interconnect them currently floundering for lack of political support and funding.

The Lower River Lot
The lower river Lot is a 120 km (74.5 mi) route from Nicole to Albas, currently with 17 locks restored, but a gap of 3 km from PK 76-79, where one lock remains to be restored, and a lock or other structure to bypass the dam at Fumel. Development of boat traffic on the river has been affected by poor conditions of navigation on the Garonne, to be crossed over a length of 5 km to gain access to the entrance lock at Nicole.

The Central River Lot
This central river Lot is a 74 km (46 mi) route, with 17 locks, from Luzech to Larnagol. The length originally reopened in May 1990 was 64 km long, to Crégols above Saint-Cirq-Lapopie. It was extended in 2008.

The Upper River Lot
The upper river Lot is a short length of 11 km (7 mi) in the département Aveyron, from la Roque-Bouillac in the commune of Livinhac-le-Haut to Port d'Agrès in the commune of Saint-Parthem, including two restored locks and a completely new lock beside the hydroelectric plant at Marcenac.

The industrial history of the river weighs heavily on today's development, since pollution has left heavy metals in the silt at locations such as Fumel (Lower Lot) and Bouillac (Upper Lot). Costly processes are required to remove these sediments, as a prerequisite for continuing restoration works on the river. The current situation with the three separate navigable sections is likely to continue into the foreseeable future.

See also
 List of canals in France
 List of rivers of France
 Olt river in Romania

References

Le Lot, Waterways Guide No. 05. Editions du Breil. 
Edwards-May, David (2010). Inland Waterways of France, 8th edition. Imray, pp 117–126. 
McKnight, Hugh (2005). Cruising French Waterways, 4th Edition. Sheridan House. .
Jefferson, David (2009). Through the French Canals. Adlard Coles Nautical. p. 275. .

External links
 River Lot (lower, central and upper) with maps, places, moorings and other details by the author of Inland Waterways of France (Imray)
 Navigation details for 80 French rivers and canals (French waterways website section)

Rivers of France
Canals in France
 
Rivers of Aveyron
Rivers of Cantal
Rivers of Lot (department)
Rivers of Lot-et-Garonne
Rivers of Lozère
Rivers of Nouvelle-Aquitaine
Rivers of Auvergne-Rhône-Alpes
Rivers of Occitania (administrative region)
Canals opened in 1776